The Lindner family is a family that has been prominent in the Cincinnati metropolitan area since the mid-20th century. They are known for their work in the insurance and investments business. As of 2015, Forbes ranks them as the 129th richest family in the United States. They are also known for their involvement in professional sports; Carl Jr. was a part owner and CEO of the Cincinnati Reds, Carl III is the majority owner and CEO of FC Cincinnati, and the family's contributions to the Western & Southern Open led to its venue being titled the Lindner Family Tennis Center.

History 
The Lindner family's rise to prominence began with Carl Lindner Sr. opening a dairy processing plant in Norwood, Ohio in 1940. The business, United Dairy Farmers, had expanded to thirty stores by 1960, and the family bought the American Financial Group with their savings. By the mid-1960s, Carl Sr.'s sons were running the family's businesses: Carl Jr. was running American Financial Group, Robert was running United Dairy Farmers, and Richard was running the Thriftway Food Drug grocery chain, which later joined with Winn-Dixie.

In 1975, Cincinnati-based American Financial Group, one of billionaire Carl Lindner, Jr.'s companies, bought into United Fruit Company. In August 1984, Lindner took control of the company and renamed it Chiquita Brands International.

In 1989, the Lindner family founded and funded the Cincinnati Hills Christian Academy.

In 1999, Carl Jr. bought controlling ownership in the Cincinnati Reds, which he held until selling to Robert Castellini in 2005.

In 2015, Carl III became majority owner and chief executive owner of the newly formed soccer club FC Cincinnati.

References 

 
Business families of the United States
American families of German ancestry
People from Norwood, Ohio